The 1968 Kansas City riot occurred in Kansas City, Missouri, in April 1968. Kansas City became one of 37 cities in the United States to be the subject of rioting after the assassination of Martin Luther King Jr. The rioting in Kansas City did not erupt on April 4, like other cities of the United States affected directly by the assassination, but rather on April 9 after local events within the city.

History 
The first sign of disorder in the streets of Kansas City was a relatively stable student march, in response to the government failing to close schools across the city that day for the funeral of Martin Luther King Jr. This was seen as a lack of respect for King by the students.

Mayor Ilus W. Davis decided to go to the marchers, meeting with them at Parade Park. After Davis joined several leaders from the Black community in talking with the marchers, he then joined the others to lead the march the remaining distance to City Hall. The crowd grew in size, slowly becoming more militant, more so when they arrived at City Hall to find a large contingent of Kansas City Police Department officers. As tensions rose, with verbal and physical actions escalating on both sides, a volley of tear gas by the KCPD into the crowd would be the final moment when the full riot was unavoidable. The students dispersed, but word of this spread through the city, and a riot erupted.

The riot resulted in nearly 300 arrests, six deaths, and at least twenty hospital admissions.

See also
Ferguson Unrest
List of incidents of civil unrest in the United States

References

Further reading
 

Kansas City Riot, 1968
Kansas City
20th century in Kansas City, Missouri
1968 in Missouri
Riots and civil disorder in Missouri
Kansas City, Missouri
April 1968 events in the United States